Glen White can mean:

 Glen White Run, an important creek forming one of the gaps of the Allegheny and especially the lower valley utilized by the PRR Horseshoe Curve climbing the escarpment between Altoona and Tunnelhill, Pennsylvania.
 Glen White (actor), an American silent movie actor
 Glen White (cricketer) (born 1970), New Zealand cricketer
 Glen White, West Virginia, a place in West Virginia

See also 
 Glenn White